Luciano Bellosi (7 July 1936 – 26 April 2011) was an Italian art historian.

Life
He was born and died in Florence, graduating from the University of Florence in 1963 alongside Roberto Longhi with a thesis on Lorenzo Monaco. He worked for the Soprintendenza alle Gallerie di Firenze from 1969 to 1979, before teaching medieval art history at the University of Siena until retiring in 2002. He took part in several international art history conferences and organised and edited the Atti del Convegno internazionale di studio su Simone Martini held in Siena in 1985.

Works

Studies and essays 
Buffalmacco e il Trionfo della Morte, Einaudi, Torino 1974; Premio Viareggio Opera Prima di Saggistica, nuova edizione 5 Continents, Milano 2003;
catalogue of Florence's Museo dello Spedale degli Innocenti, Milano 1977;
La pecora di Giotto, Einaudi, Torino 1985;
monograph on Cimabue, Federico Motta, Milano 1998;
Come un prato fiorito. Studi sull'arte tardogotica, Jaca Book, Milano 2000;
"I vivi parean vivi" : scritti di storia dell'arte italiana del Duecento e del Trecento, Centro Di, Firenze 2006.

Exhibitions
He organised the following exhibitions and edited their catalogues: 
Arte in Valdichiana dal XIII al XVIII secolo, Cortona 1970;
Lorenzo Ghiberti: Materia e ragionamenti, Firenze 1978;
Pittura di luce. Giovanni di Francesco e l'arte fiorentina di metà Quattrocento, Firenze 1990;
Una scuola per Piero. Luce, colore e prospettiva nella formazione fiorentina di Piero della Francesca, Firenze 1992;
Francesco di Giorgio e il Rinascimento a Siena, Siena 1993.
Masaccio e le origini del Rinascimento, San Giovanni Valdarno 2003
Duccio. Alle origini della pittura senese, Siena 2003

Personal library and archive 
The Biblioteca Umanistica dell'Università di Siena houses his library of 8000 volumes, particularly art historical monographs.

References

External links 

1936 births
2011 deaths
Italian art critics
Italian art historians
Writers from Florence
20th-century Italian writers